Bobby Allain (born 28 November 1991) is a French professional footballer who plays as a goalkeeper for Super League Greece club Ionikos. He has previously played in France for Ivry, Red Star and Dijon.

Club career
Allain signed his first professional contract with Clyde in Scotland, where he played in the under-19 team. He returned to France, and began playing senior football with Ivry and Red Star, before moving to Dijon in 2016.

Allain spent a couple of years as the backup goalkeeper at Dijon. He made his professional debut with Dijon in a 3–1 Coupe de la Ligue win over Caen on 31 October 2018.

On 24 July 2019, Greek Super League side Olympiacos announced the signing of Allain on a two-year contract.

On 28 December 2020 it was announced that Örebro SK, of Sweden's top division Allsvenskan, had signed Bobby on a one year deal.

In August 2022 it was announced that he had signed for Gazélec Ajaccio.

Personal life
Allain was born in France, and is of Scottish descent through his mother and holds a British passport. His uncle Xavier Perez was the goalkeeper for Red Star in the 1980s.

Both of Allain's parents are deaf, and he is fluent in sign language. In his spare time he is the goalkeeper coach for France's deaf football team.

Honours

Club
Olympiacos
 Super League Greece: 2019–20
 Greek Cup: 2019–20

References

External links
 
 Sofoot Profile

1991 births
Living people
People from Clamart
Association football goalkeepers
French footballers
French people of Scottish descent
Ligue 1 players
Championnat National players
Championnat National 2 players
Championnat National 3 players
Super League Greece players
Allsvenskan players
Superettan players
Dijon FCO players
Red Star F.C. players
Clyde F.C. players
US Ivry players
Olympiacos F.C. players
Örebro SK players
Dalkurd FF players
French expatriate footballers
French expatriate sportspeople in Greece
Expatriate footballers in Greece
French expatriate sportspeople in Sweden
Expatriate footballers in Sweden
Footballers from Hauts-de-Seine
Expatriate footballers in Scotland
French expatriate sportspeople in Scotland